Maginn may refer to:

Surname
Notable people with the surname include:
Adrian Maginn (born 1954), Australian former rower and rowing coach
Bonnie Maginn (1880–1964), American actor
Edward Maginn (1802–1849), Irish Roman Catholic priest, advocate of Catholic Emancipation, supporter of Daniel O'Connell in the Repeal movement
Edward Joseph Maginn (1897–1984), Scottish-born American Catholic Bishop for Albany, New York State
Francis Maginn (1861–1918), Church of Ireland missionary and one of the co-founders of British Deaf Association
Matt Maginn, musician from Omaha, Nebraska
Robert Maginn (born 1956), United States businessman, former Chairman in the Massachusetts Republican Party 
Simon Maginn (born 1961), British writer
William Maginn (1794–1842), Irish journalist and miscellaneous writer

Buildings 
Bishop Maginn High School, a Catholic high school in Albany, New York State
Maginn Park, a football stadium located in Buncrana, County Donegal, Ireland

de:Maginn